Luka Marić (1899-1979) was a prominent Croatian Serb mineralogist and geologist who taught at the University of Zagreb. The sodium phosphate mineral Marinite is named after him. Luka Marić was a lifelong honorary president of SKD Prosvjeta in Zagreb and a member of the Serbian Academy of Arts and Sciences in Belgrade

References

External links
 
 

1899 births
1979 deaths
Croatian geologists
Mineralogists
Members of the Serbian Academy of Sciences and Arts
20th-century geologists
20th-century Croatian scientists
Academic staff of the University of Zagreb